Barry Marder is an American stand-up comedian, actor, and writer. He is identified with the character of Ted L. Nancy, author of the Letters from a Nut series of books.

Career
Marder has performed at most major theaters in the United States as opening act for Jerry Seinfeld.

Marder wrote for Bill Maher, Jay Leno, David Letterman, and the talk show Night Stand with Dick Dietrick.

Marder also co-wrote the DreamWorks film Bee Movie, with Jerry Seinfeld, Spike Feresten, and Andy Robin, which was released on November 2, 2007.

Marder appeared on Seinfeld's internet series Comedians in Cars Getting Coffee on September 6, 2012 in the episode "You Don't Want to Offend a Cannibal", as well as on July 19, 2019, in the episode "Big Lots and BevMo!"

In 1984, he appeared, acting as "Rappaport", in  a comedy film, Where the Boys Are '84.

"Ted L. Nancy"
Under the pseudonym "Ted L. Nancy," Marder wrote a series of books of prank letters, together with their responses.  Books in the series include: Letters from a Nut, More Letters from a Nut, Extra Nutty! Even More Letters from a Nut, Hello Junk Mail!, Ted L. Nancy’s Afternoon Stories, and All New Letters from a Nut. Comedian Bruce Baum is the co-author of the first three books.

In 2002, ABC developed a pilot for a television series based on Letters From A Nut. It was written and produced by Barry Marder and Jerry Seinfeld.  In 2003 FX Television made a pilot for "The Ted L. Nancy Show." That show was written and produced by Marder and Seinfeld. Again in 2007, Lionsgate Television optioned the books from Marder to make into a television show, as reported by Daily Variety.  The following year, Lionsgate sold the show as a pilot presentation to Fox TV. That show called Sincerely, Ted L. Nancy is created and written by Seinfeld, Marder and Chuck Martin. In the pilot, Ted L. Nancy (Kevin Sussman) is the voice for the underdog consumer who is usually the last to get help from customer service.

In 2013 Scholastic published an historical Ted L. Nancy book entitled Letters From A Nut's Family Tree.

In April 2016, the first two episodes of Ted L. Nancy's SCAMMERS appeared on Hulu. The shorts were produced with Robert Redford's Sundance Productions. In these,Ted L. Nancy answers unscrupulous people who promise him great wealth through emails.

"Letters From A Nut: The Play"

In June 2017 the "Letters From A Nut" Play was presented at the Geffen Playhouse in Los Angeles for a five-week run. Ted L. Nancy read his letters and Beth Kennedy read the replies bringing the books to life. Video and artwork by Alan Marder accompanied the presentation.

In 2019, Patrick Warburton toured the country with a different version of the Letters From A Nut Play. Warburton read the letters as Ted L. Nancy with rotating actors in the Service Rep role.

Unfrosted  
 
In June 2021, Netflix won a bidding war for the film, Unfrosted. It stars and is directed by Jerry Seinfeld. It is written by Seinfeld, Spike Feresten, and Barry Marder. Production is underway now.

See also
Henry Root
Wanda Tinasky
Don Novello (the "Lazlo" letters)
Ed Broth
Silly Beggar
Robert Popper

References

External links

American humorists
Pseudonymous writers
Living people
Year of birth missing (living people)